William Fraser (1868 – unknown) was a Scottish footballer who played in the Football League for Stoke.

Career
Fraser was born in Glasgow and played for Renton before joining English side Stoke in 1891. He played three matches for Stoke during the 1891–92 season before returning to Renton.

Career statistics

References

Scottish footballers
Stoke City F.C. players
English Football League players
1868 births
Year of death missing
Renton F.C. players
Association football wing halves
Footballers from Glasgow